Galvez Esporte Clube, commonly known as Galvez, is a Brazilian professional football club based in Rio Branco, Acre founded on 3 July 2011. It competes in the Campeonato Acreano, the top flight of the Acre state football league.

Galvez is the second-best ranked team from Acre in CBF's national club ranking, behind Atlético Acreano.

History
Galvez Esporte Clube was founded in 2011 by military police officers.

Crest
The colors allude to the Acre flag. The shield, on the left side of the shirt, has a crown in reference to Luis Gálvez Rodríguez de Arias, Emperor of the Independent State of Acre. Inside the shield is the presence of the solitary star, symbol of the Acriana Revolution, a royal hawk attacking a ball, and two crossed arms, symbolizing the state military police.

Stadium
São Raimundo play their home games at Estádio Florestão. The stadium has a maximum capacity of 12,000 people.

Honours
 Campeonato Acreano
 Winners (1): 2020

 Campeonato Acreano Second Division
 Winners (1): 2012

References

External links
 Galvez in OGol.com

Association football clubs established in 2011
Football clubs in Acre (state)
2011 establishments in Brazil